Blade of a Knife is the first full-length album by punk rock band Bomb Factory. It was released in August 1996 on the independent label, Monster Company.

Track listing

External links
Bomb Factory's official website

Bomb Factory (band) albums
1996 debut albums